German railway route numbers (German:Streckennummern) are used to designate and identify railway routes, or sections of routes, within Germany. In Germany, there are a total of 3 different numbering systems used by the Deutsche Bahn, which meet different requirements.

These systems are:
 VzG line numbers (four digit, unambiguous identification of a railway line)
 Timetabled route numbers (three digit, Kursbuchstrecke referring to a route of passenger services)
 Restricted speed section (La) route numbers (one to three digit)

In addition there are numbers in the railway operators' timetables; these are not covered here.

Sources 

 Eisenbahnatlas Deutschland, Ausgabe 2007/2008, Schweers & Wall, 
 Das große Archiv der Eisenbahnstrecken in Deutschland, Herausgeber Ernst Huber, Geranova
 Hans-Jürgen Geisler: DB-Streckendaten – STREDA, Eisenbahningenieur (49) 12/1998

External links 
DB Netz AG TPS route pricing system
Table with route numbers (Microsoft Excel file, 362 kb)
Explanation of VzG route numbers
Railway land register
History of German railway infrastructure

Railway lines in Germany